A jingle is a memorable slogan, set to an engaging melody, mainly broadcast on radio and sometimes on television commercials. 

Jingle or jingles may also refer to:

Music
 Jingle (percussion), one of a group of small discs or bells in a percussion instrument
 Jingle bell, a small bell of the type mentioned in the song
 "Jingle Bells", a popular Christmas song
 Jingles (album), a 2002 album by Australian band Regurgitator
 "Jingles", a song by Wes Montgomery on the 1959 album The Wes Montgomery Trio
 Jingles (1998), Jingles 2 (2005), and Jingles 3 (2012), albums by a cappella group Voice Male

Other uses
 Jingle (carriage), a covered carriage formerly used in Cork, Ireland
 Jingle (protocol), a VoIP extension to the extensible Messaging and presence protocol
 Jingle Belle, a cartoon character created by Paul Dini
 Jingle County, in Shanxi, China
 Jingle Magazine, a Filipino magazine; see Roxlee
 "Jingle, Jingle, Jingle", an episode of the children's television series Shining Time Station
 One of several species of mollusk in the family Anomiidae, genus Anomia
 Jingles, a character portrayed by actor Andy Devine in the 1950s American television western series The Adventures of Wild Bill Hickok

See also
 Jingle Jangle (disambiguation)